Agrias hewitsonius is a butterfly of the family Nymphalidae. It is found in South America. It was described by Henry Walter Bates in 1860.

Subspecies
Agrias hewitsonius hewitsonius (Brazil (Amazonas))
Agrias hewitsonius beatifica (Ecuador, Peru)
Agrias hewitsonius stuarti (Peru, Colombia, Brazil (Amazonas))
Agrias hewitsonius beata (Peru)

References

Charaxinae
Fauna of Brazil
Nymphalidae of South America
Butterflies described in 1860
Taxa named by Henry Walter Bates